Beth Kingston (born 3 November 1986)  is an English actress best known for playing India Longford in the British soap opera Hollyoaks from 2009 to 2010. India was killed-off in 2010 but Kingston reprised the role and returned in 2011 and 2012 as a vision to her sister.

Kingston trained at the Redroofs Film and Television School. In 2009 she auditioned for the role of India in Hollyoaks Desperately Seeking, a competition run by Hollyoaks. She won the competition.

She has also worked in pantomime.

Filmography

References

English soap opera actresses
Living people
1986 births
Alumni of the University of Warwick
English stage actresses